The 1904 New York state election was held on November 8, 1904, to elect the governor, the lieutenant governor, the Secretary of State, the state comptroller, the attorney general, the state treasurer, the state engineer, the chief judge and an associate judge of the New York Court of Appeals, as well as all members of the New York State Assembly and the New York State Senate.

History
The Prohibition state convention met on June 14 and 15 at Oswego, New York. Henry W. Wilbur was Temporary Chairman until the choice of Alfred L. Manierre as Permanent Chairman. They nominated John McKee, of Brooklyn, for Governor; Alden W. Young for Lieutenant Governor; James C. Carpenter, of New York City, for Secretary of State; Ira W. Littlefield, of Watertown, for Comptroller; C. A. Shipplebein, of Glens Falls, for Treasurer; and George E. Hillman, of Rochester, for Attorney General.

The Socialist Labor state convention met on July 7 at 2, New Reade Street in Manhattan. They nominated Daniel De Leon for Governor; Boris Reinstein, of Buffalo, for Lieutenant Governor; Anton Metzler for Secretary of State; James A. Trainor, of Syracuse, for Comptroller; Harvey A. Santee, of New York City, for Treasurer; Frank E. Passanno for Attorney General; and Orcus A. Curtis, of Buffalo, for the Court of Appeals.

The 1904 Democratic National Convention nominated the Chief Judge of the New York Court of Appeals Alton B. Parker for U.S. President. Upon accepting the nomination, he resigned his judicial office on August 5, and a month later Democrat Edgar M. Cullen was appointed by Republican Governor Benjamin B. Odell, Jr., to fill the vacancy, as part of a cross endorsement deal to elect also Republican associate judge William E. Werner.

The Republican state convention met on September 14 and 15 at Saratoga Springs, New York. Jacob Sloat Fassett was Temporary Chairman until the choice of George R. Malby as Permanent Chairman. The convention was marked by the fight between the two Republican bosses: Governor Odell and Thomas C. Platt. Odell's candidate, the incumbent Lieutenant Governor Higgins, was nominated by acclamation after Platt's man, Ex-Lieutenant Governor Timothy L. Woodruff, withdrew. All other candidates were also nominated by acclamation.

On September 16, the Populist State Committee selected a ticket to be circulated to gather the necessary signatures for the petition to file the ticket. They nominated Alfred J. Boulton for Governor; Charles Spaulding, of Buffalo, for Lieutenant Governor; Orsen L. Drew, of Rochester, for Secretary of State; Louis Manz, of Rochester, for Comptroller; Frank S. Rose, of Albany, for Treasurer; John F. Gaffney, Utica, for Attorney General; Simon G. Levy, of New York City, for State Engineer; Edward N. Heath, of Buffalo, for Chief Judge; and Augustus Babcock, of Binghamton, for associate judge of the Court of Appeals. The petition was filed with the Secretary of State in October.

The Democratic state convention met on September 21 at Saratoga Springs, New York.

Result
The whole Republican ticket was elected.

The incumbents O'Brien, Kelsey, Van Alstyne and Cullen were re-elected. The incumbent Cunneen was defeated.

The Republican, Democratic, Social Democratic and Prohibition parties maintained automatic ballot status (necessary 10,000 votes), the Socialist Labor Party lost it, and the re-founded People's party did not attain it.

Obs.: 
 "Blank, defective and scattering" votes: 8,121 (Governor)
 Numbers for Cullen and Werner are total votes on Republican and Democratic tickets.

Notes

Sources
The Democratic candidates: THE DEMOCRATIC CANDIDATES in NYT on September 22, 1904
The minor parties: The Noise from the Big Show Going on in the Two-Ring Political Tent Has Not Entirely Drowned the Voices of the Barkers for the Minor Entertainments on the Dead Line in NYT Magazine on October 23, 1904
Result: STATE ELECTION FIGURES.; Official Returns as Certified by Board of State Canvassers in NYT on December 16, 1904
Result: The Tribune Almanac 1905

Further reading
 McCormick, Richard L. From Realignment to Reform: Political Change in New York State 1893-1910 (Cornell University Press, 1981).
 Wesser, Robert F. "Theodore Roosevelt: Reform and Reorganization of the Republican Party in New York, 1901-1906." New York History 46.3 (1965): 230-252 online.

See also
New York gubernatorial elections

1904
1904 New York (state) elections